The Dengineers is a British children's television series which airs on CBBC and sees the production team (styled as 'dengineers') design themed dens or play houses for children. There have been seven series aired to date, with the most recent hosted by Meryl Fernandes and Joe Swash and previous hosts being Lauren Layfield, Mark Wright and Joe Tracini. The designers are currently Tony Broomhead, Satwinder Samra, Maral Tulip, Emma Kosh, Anthony Devine, Lynsey Ford, Martin Bell, Sahiba Chadha and formerly Dee Saigal, Sege Rosella and Olga Skumial. The series is similar to DIY SOS and Grand Designs, with the help of expert designers and builders and the youngsters themselves, the Dengineers team will then construct an extraordinary den, either completely from scratch or by transforming an existing room in the home. Each episode is themed, with designs such as an old-fashioned railway station, a 1960s American diner and an Australian outback shack.

As of early 2017, The Dengineers is also airing in the United States on the Discovery Family cable network and as of 2021 Czech Television has licensed the first two seasons.

The show won the Factual Entertainment category at the British Academy Children's Awards in 2019.

Production
The Dengineers was first announced on 16 December 2014, with other CBBC commissions for 2015. On 11 April 2015, it was announced that Mark Wright would host with then-future CBBC HQ host Lauren Layfield. On 7 July 2016, a second series was commissioned. On 11 April 2017, it was announced that Wright was set to leave and be replaced by Joe Tracini. In 2017, a special in partnership with Children in Need and Blue Peter aired with guests Naomi Wilkinson, Ayshah Tull, Katie Thistleton, Ben Shires, Rhys Stephenson and Hacker T. Dog.

Episodes

Series 1 (2015–2016)

Series 2 (2016–2017)

Series 3 (2017–2018)

Series 4 (2018)

Series 5 (2019–2020)

Series 6 (2021)

Series 7 (2022-)

References

External links 
 
 

2010s British children's television series
English-language television shows
Home renovation television series
2015 British television series debuts
British children's education television series
CBBC shows
BBC children's television shows
Television series by BBC Studios